Valerian is a given name and surname.

Ancient world 
 Valerian (emperor) (200–c. 260), Roman emperor (253-260)
 Valerian II (died 257), Roman Caesar, grandson of the Emperor Valerian
 Saints Tiburtius, Valerian and Maximus
 Valerian of Abbenza (377–457), bishop of Abbenza
 Valerian Protasewicz (1505-1579), bishop of Lutsk and Vilnius, founder of the Jesuit college

Modern world 
 Valerian Abakovsky (1895-1921), Russian engineer, inventor of the Aerowagon
 Valerian Albanov (1881–1919), Russian navigator
 Valerian Bestayev (born 1982), Russian  footballer
 Valerian Borisovich Aptekar (1889-1937), Russian linguist and propagandist
 Valerian Engelhardt (1798-1856), Russian lieutenant general 
 Valerian Freyberg, 3rd Baron Freyberg (born 1970), British peer, sitting as a crossbencher
 Valerian A. Frolov (1895–1961), Soviet Russian military figure
 Valerian Borowczyk (1923-2006), Polish film director
 Valerian Gaprindashvili (1888-1941), Georgian Symbolist poet and translator 
 Valerian Gârlă (born 1986), Romanian football player
 Valerian Gracias (1900–1978), Indian Roman Catholic cardinal
 Valerian Gribayedoff (1858–1908), Russian-American journalist
 Valerian Gunia (1862-1938), Georgian dramatist, actor, director, critic, and translator
 Valerian Gvilia (born 1994), Georgian football midfielder 
 Valerian Kalinka (1826-1886), Polish priest and historian
 Valerian Klenevski, Azerbaijani politician, Minister of Social Security 
 Valerian Kobakhia (1929-1992), Abkhaz Soviet statesman and party leader
 Valerian Krasinski (1795-1855), Polish Calvinist politician, nationalist and historian
 Valerian Kuybyshev (1888–1935), a Russian revolutionary, Red Army officer and prominent Soviet politician
 Valerian Madatov (1782–1829), Russian prince and Lieutenant General
 Valerian Maykov (1823-1847), Russian writer and literary critic
 Valerian Netedu (born 1953),  Romanian ice hockey goaltender
 Valerian Onițiu (1872-1948), Romanian chess problemist
 Valerian Osinsky (1887-1938),  Russian revolutionary Marxist 
 Valerian Pereverzev (1882–1968), Soviet literary scholar
 Valerian Pidmohylny (1901–1939), Ukrainian realist novelist
 Valerian Pletnev (1886–1947),  Russian revolutionary, playwright and activist
 Valerian Polyansky (1881-1948),  Bolshevik revolutionary and later state functionary 
 Valerian Revenco (1939–2016), Moldovan politician, Minister of Labor, Family and Social Protection
 Valerian Rodrigues (born 1949), Indian political scientist
 Valerian Ruminski (born 1967), American singer
 Valerian Rybar (1919-1990), American interior designer
 Valerian Safonovich (1798-1867), Russian ruler of Oryol Governorate
 Valérian Sauveplane (born 1980), French sport shooter
 Valerian Savelyev (born 1962), Russian football player and coach
 Valerian Shalikashvili (1874-1919), Georgian producer, actor, and playwright
 Valerian Sidamon-Eristavi (1889-1983), Georgian Modernist artist and set designer
 Valerian Sokolov (born 1946), Soviet boxer
 Valerian Șesan (1878-1940), Romanian theologian
 Valerián Švec (born 1995), Slovak football player and coach
 Valerian Stan (born 1955), Romanian dignitary, lawyer and military officer, civic and human rights activist 
 Valerian Tevzadze (1894-1987), Georgian military officer
 Valerian Trifa (1914–1987), Romanian Orthodox cleric and fascist political activist
 Valerian Ume-Ezeoke (born 1993),  American football player
 Valerian Wellesley, 8th Duke of Wellington (1915-2014), styled Marquess of Douro, member of the House of Lords
 Valerian Zirakadze (born 1978), Georgian footballer 
 Valerian Zorin (1902-1986), Soviet diplomat
 Valerian Zubov (1771-1804), Russian general who led the Persian Expedition of 1796
 Lars Valerian Ahlfors (1907-1996), Finnish mathematician

Surname 
 Bice Valerian (1886-1969), Italian film actress of the silent era
 Gerald Valerian Wellesley (1809-1882), Church of England cleric who became the Dean of Windsor
 I. Valerian (1895-1980), Romanian writer
 Jan Valerián Jirsík (1798-1883), Roman Catholic Bishop of Budweis

See also 

 Valery (name)
 Valerie (given name)
 Valeriu (given name)
 Valerius (name)

 Valeria (given name)
 Valerian (disambiguation)
 Valeriano (name)
 Valerianus (disambiguation)

 Valer (disambiguation)
 Valera (disambiguation)
 Valérien (disambiguation)

 Walerian
 Valerian Runkovsky, town in Transnistria, Moldova
 Valeriano Lunense, a place near Five Lands, Italy

 
 

Masculine given names